Rabochaya Gazeta (Russian: Рабочая Газета, IPA: [rɐˈbot͡ɕɪjə ɡɐˈzʲetə], lit. 'Workers' Newspaper'; from No. 1 to No. 97 - Rabochiy) was a Soviet newspaper which was an organ of the Central Committee of the All-Union Communist Party (Bolsheviks).

History 
The newspaper was founded on March 1, 1922 in Moscow. Its first chief editor was Konstantin Eremeev (1922–1928) and later at various times it was edited by F. Ya. Kon, N. I. Smirnov, K. Maltsev and V. Filatov. 

By 1927, the circulation of the newspaper exceeded 300 thousand copies. The newspaper played an important role in the implementation of the Party's policy of mobilizing the forces of the working class of the USSR to fulfill the tasks of socialist construction and in the developing of troops and socialist emulation.

A number of magazines began to appear as supplements to the newspaper, many of them eventually became independent publications. Most famously magazines such as Krokodil, Rabotnitsa, Murzilka, Soviet Ekran and some others. 

The last issue of the newspaper was published on January 29, 1932. After 1932, the employees of the closed newspaper moved to the newly formed editorial office of the newspaper "Water Transport", which became the organ of the USSR People's Commissariat for Water and the Central Committee of the trade union of water workers.

See also 
Rabochaya Gazeta (1897)

References

Newspapers published in the Soviet Union
Publications of the Communist Party of the Soviet Union
Communist newspapers
Russian-language newspapers published in Russia
Newspapers established in 1922

Central Committee of the Communist Party of the Soviet Union
1922 establishments in Russia